Trochulus villosus is a species of small, air-breathing land snail, a terrestrial pulmonate gastropod mollusk in the family Hygromiidae, the hairy snails and their allies.

Distribution 
This species occurs in Germany.

References

External links 
 http://www.animalbase.uni-goettingen.de/zooweb/servlet/AnimalBase/home/species?id=2678
 http://www.mollbase.org/list/index.php?aktion=zeige_taxon&id=871

Hygromiidae
Gastropods described in 1805